Why Not Today was a hit for R&B, funk band, 9th Creation in 1977. It made it into both the Billboard and Record World charts.

Background
In March 1977, "Why Not Today" by 9th Creation was released on Prelude 71085. Produced by Buddy Scott, the single was 4:45 long. Phil Medley both arranged and conducted the music. It appears on their Reaching for the Top album that was released on Prelude PRL 12146 in October that year. Along with "We're Still Together" by Peaches & Herb and the Phyllis Hyman album by Phyllis Hyman, it was a Record World R&B Pick for March 26. Mentioned in the short review was the explosive rhythm and harmony with a potential to race up the chart.

Airplay and chart history
The June 4th issue of Cash Box showed the single was getting airplay on Don Brooks' show at WWIN in Baltimore and E. Rodney Jones' show at WVON in Chicago, but there was no register in the magazine's Box Top 100 R&B Chart.
Eventually the record made it to the Billboard Soul chart.  It entered the Hot Soul Singles Chart on June 4 at #98, holding the position for two weeks. It also made the Record World  R&B Singles chart, entering at #67 on June 4. By June 18, on its third week, it was at #63.

References

External links
 MusicBrainz Why Not Today

1977 singles
Songs written by Phil Medley